Damer, or Damar, is a small volcanic island in the Barat Daya Islands group in Indonesia's Maluku province, on the southern side of the Banda Sea. It is flanked by four smaller islands - one to the east, one to the west and two to the south. Together they are called the Damar Islands, and constitute one administrative district within the Maluku Barat Daya Regency. The district has a land area of 392.29 km2 and had a population of 5,718 at the 2020 Census.

Description
Damar is about 20 km (12 mi.) long by 18 km (11 mi.) wide. It lies about 125 km (78 mi.) east of Romang and 200 km (124 mi.) east of Wetar. The northern part of the island has been largely cleared for dryland farming of coconuts, cashews, coffee beans, cocoa beans, cloves and nutmegs, while the southern part is still mainly forested. Habitation is concentrated in the north and east; most islanders are farmers or fishers. The highest point of the island is 868 m (2,847 ft) Mount Wurlali, an andesitic stratovolcano.

Important Bird Area

The forested part of the island has been identified by BirdLife International as an Important Bird Area because it supports the endemic Damar flycatcher, which is largely restricted to lowland evergreen forest habitat.

References

Barat Daya Islands
Important Bird Areas of Indonesia
Populated places in Indonesia